Racing Galette Football Club is a football team from Guernsey, Channel Islands. They compete in the Guernsey 5-a-side Business League division 1.

History

2008-2012

Racing Galette Football Club was founded in 2008 under the patronage of Guernsey restaurant, Le Creperie. Captained by Adam Bayfield the team entered into the Guernsey Business League Division 4 and enjoyed a successful debut season, winning promotion to Division 3 for the 2009/10 season.

Racing Galette started the 2009/10 season well, maintaining a position high up the league table before fading in the second half of the season, largely due to a combination of injury and suspension. Racing Galette finished the season in third place which was good enough to earn the team promotion.  Thom Ogier was sent off at least twice this season.

In February 2011, Racing Galette became the Guernsey Press' first 'Team of the week' a feature which has continued ever since.

During the 2010/11 season Racing Galette failed in their bid for promotion for a third successive season.  James Croshaw also failed in his repeated attempts to remove Adam Bayfield from his joint roles as first team coach, captain and chairman.

During the autumn of 2011 Racing Galette were at the height of their powers.  During the opening 11 games of the 2011/12 season the club collected a record 31 points to put them joint-top of the division at the half-way point.  Needless to say, Racing Galette celebrated one of the best ever Christmas parties that year.  However, the winter break will also be remembered for an (unrelated) career-ending injury to Johnny Wallbridge.

The team failed to reproduce their early season form without their first-choice goalkeeper and eventually finished 5th.  Due to the re-structuring of the league pyramid to 3 tiers from 4 this was sufficient for promotion to division 1.  Alec Thoumine was sent off for kicking the ball away.

Real Galette 

2010 brought a radical shift in the Galette franchise as it split in two, Racing Galette remaining the Guernsey team and Real Galette re-locating to London. The two teams run in parallel, players with the option to switch sides depending on location.

A number of players have left Racing to join Real since the latter's relocation to the capital. Nick Robinson, Thom Ogier, Alec Thoumine and Real captain Gordon Macrae have all played for both teams.

Alec Thoumine became the first player to leave Real for Racing when he controversially returned to the island in March 2011.

Season One

Real Galette, under club VC Gordon Macrae, added the Crowborough defender Nick Wheatley and North London goalkeeper Will Mallett to a team composed predominately of Guernsey expatriates and former Racing players.

Les Verts entered the Clapham late leagues in early October and starting the season brightly, briefly topping the division after a win and a draw in their opening two fixtures.

However, an unfortunate broken wrist meant Gordon Macrae missed the next match and, without their inspirational captain, Real's season faded. The club taking only four points from the remaining six matches to finish in fourth position.

Nicolas Robinson top-scored. Neither Thom Ogier or Alec Thoumine were sent off in any games.

On 28 December, the first Racing Galette Vs Real Galette match was held, with Real Galette coming out on top in a comfortable 15-12  win.

Season Two

Real Galette transferred to the East London Powerleague Division 3 in late January. The club entered the league halfway through the season and continued their wretched run of form.

After conceding 26 goals in two games, Real registered their first victory since the previous October, demolishing bottom club Five Rivers 17–1. The result galvanised Real's season, the club going on to lose only one more game and finishing the season in a respectable fifth.

Alec Thoumine top-scored with 18 goals. Thom Ogier was only sent off once.

Players
Racing Galette player list

Current squad

Honours (first team)
League Promotion from Division 2 2012
League Promotion from Division 3 2010
League Promotion from Division 4 2009

Notes

External links
Racing Galette Official
Facebook fan page

Football in Guernsey